Pârâul Stânei may refer to the following rivers in Romania:

 Pârâul Stânei, a tributary of the Bâsca Mică in Buzău County
 Pârâul Stânei, a tributary of the Ghimbav in Argeș County
 Pârâul Stânei, a tributary of the Lotru in Vâlcea County
 Pârâul Stânei, a tributary of the Teleajen in Prahova County
 Valea Stânei, a tributary of the Goagiu in Harghita County